Woodlawn Plantation was a large plantation located in eastern Leon County, Florida, U.S., owned by Thomas Peter Chaires.

Chaires, along with his 2 brothers Green H. Chaires and Benjamin Chaires, established large plantations during the Florida Territorial Period of 1821-1845. Green Chaires would establish Evergreen Hills Plantation and Benjamin would establish Verdura Plantation.

Plantation specifics
The Leon County Florida 1860 Agricultural Census shows that the Woodlawn Plantation had the following:
 Improved Land: N/A
 Unimproved Land: N/A
 Cash value of plantation: N/A
 Cash value of farm implements/machinery: N/A
 Cash value of farm animals: N/A
 Number of slaves: N/A
 Bushels of corn: N/A
 Bales of cotton: N/A

The plantations would eventually form the community hub of Chaires. In 2000 the community of Chaires was listed on the National Register of Historic Places.

The owner
Chaires' father was Major Benjamin Chaires who laid out and named the area of Jacksonville, Florida in 1822. Chaires is also listed as a voter in First Florida Election of 1845.

References
1845 voters
Florida Historical Markers Program
Little Chaires
Paisley, Clifton; From Cotton To Quail, University of Florida Press, c1968.

Plantations in Leon County, Florida